Witton railway station serves the Witton area of the city of Birmingham, England.  It is situated on the Birmingham-Walsall Line, part of the former Grand Junction Railway, opened in 1837. The line through the station was electrified in 1966 as part of the London Midland Region's electrification programme. The actual energization of the line from Coventry to Walsall through Aston took place on 15 August 1966. The station, and all trains serving it, are operated by West Midlands Trains.

The station sits above Witton Road, the A4040 Outer Ring Road, as the railway line here is on an embankment.  It is the closest station to Villa Park, home of Aston Villa F.C. and is advertised  as the station for Villa Park on station signage. During Randy Lerner’s ownership of Aston Villa, there had been discussions on changing the name of Witton Station to Villa Park as is the case with West Bromwich Albion's local railway station, The Hawthorns. Aston Villa's former CEO, Bruce Langham, said that the former West Midlands Passenger Transport Executive (Centro) were amenable to the idea as long as it is done at the expense of the club. No action has yet been taken.

Facilities
The station is no longer staffed, its ticket office having been closed by London Midland in 2013. Tickets must now be purchased in advance, or from a self-service ticket machine on platform 2, or on the train. Waiting accommodation is provided in the brick buildings on both platforms, whilst train running information is given via timetable posters, CIS screens, help points and automatic announcements.  Step-free access to both platforms is available via ramps from street level.

Services
Witton is served by trains between Wolverhampton and Walsall via Birmingham New Street, operating every 30 minutes Monday-Saturday daytimes and every 60 minutes evenings and Sundays. These services are operated by Class 350 electric multiple units.

References

External links

Rail Around Birmingham and the West Midlands: Witton railway station
Railways of Warwickshire entry

Railway stations in Birmingham, West Midlands
DfT Category E stations
Former London and North Western Railway stations
Railway stations in Great Britain opened in 1876
Railway stations served by West Midlands Trains